Admir Kalender (born 12 January 2001) is a Croatian tennis player.

Kalender has a career high ATP singles ranking of 1500 achieved on 14 June 2021. He also has a career high ATP doubles ranking of 1137 achieved on 14 June 2021.

Kalender made his ATP main draw debut at the 2021 Croatia Open Umag after receiving a wildcard into the doubles main draw.

References

External links

2001 births
Living people
Croatian male tennis players
21st-century Croatian people